Georges Harold Roger Gautschi (6 April 1904 – 12 February 1985) was a Swiss figure skater. He won the bronze medal in men's singles at age nineteen at the 1924 Chamonix Olympics. He went on to come in third at the 1926 European Figure Skating Championships and then came in second in 1929. Gautschi won the bronze medal at the 1930 World Figure Skating Championships.

Results

References
 Skatabase: 1920s Europeans
 Skatabase: 1920s Worlds
 Skatabase: 1930s Worlds

1904 births
1985 deaths
Swiss male single skaters
Figure skaters at the 1924 Winter Olympics
Olympic figure skaters of Switzerland
Olympic bronze medalists for Switzerland
Olympic medalists in figure skating
World Figure Skating Championships medalists
European Figure Skating Championships medalists
Medalists at the 1924 Winter Olympics